Gheeraerts is a surname. Notable people with the surname include:

Marcus Gheeraerts the Elder (1520–1590), Flemish painter, draughtsman, print designer, and etcher
Marcus Gheeraerts the Younger (1561/62–1636), Flemish painter, son of Marcus the Elder

See also
 Geeraerts (disambiguation)